Randle General Hospital is a state general hospital in the Surulere district of Lagos, Nigeria. It was established for community use in 1964 by Chief Majekodunmi and it was one of the first health care clinics in Surulere. 

The hospital is extremely busy, particularly in the accident and emergency department.

This hospital was established to offer maternal and child health care, dental services, medical and surgical services etc. It is sometimes referred to as the Surulere General Hospital. The medical director of the hospital is Dr. Aduke Odutayo.

The hospital recorded a total of 6929 patients visiting the dental section for the period of January to December in the year 2020.

References

Hospitals in Lagos
1964 establishments in Nigeria
Hospitals established in 1964